The 2021 NCAA Bowling Championship was the 17th edition of the NCAA Bowling Championship, the annual tournament to determine the national champion of women's NCAA collegiate ten-pin bowling. The tournament was hosted by the University of Central Missouri and played at the AMF Pro Bowl Lanes in North Kansas City, Missouri from April 7–10, 2021.

Qualification
Since there is only one national collegiate championship for women's bowling, all NCAA bowling programs (whether from Division I, Division II, or Division III) were eligible. A total of 16 teams competed in the double elimination tournament, with six conference champions receiving automatic bids and ten teams receiving at-large bids. The teams were revealed in a selection show on March 31, 2021.

Bids
Sixteen teams contested the tournament. The Southland Bowling League (SBL) had the most bids of any conference with five, while the Northeast Conference (NEC) had four and the Mid-Eastern Athletic Conference (MEAC) had two. The Allegheny Mountain Collegiate Conference (AMCC), Southwestern Athletic Conference (SWAC), East Coast Conference (ECC), and Great Lakes Valley Conference (GLVC) sent only their conference tournament champion; the first three by an automatic bid and the last by an at-large bid. Additionally, one independent team received an at-large bid to the tournament.

Due in part to the tournament's expansion to sixteen teams, seven programs made their NCAA Tournament debut; three automatic qualifiers and four at-large bids.

Schedule

Tournament bracket

Region 1

Region 2

Region 3

Region 4

Finals

References

NCAA Bowling Championship
2021 in American sports
2021 in bowling
2021 in sports in Missouri
April 2021 sports events in the United States